Clarkeipterus is a genus of prehistoric eurypterid classified as part of the family Dolichopteridae. The genus contains two species, C. otisius and C. testudineus, both from the Silurian Bertie Formation of the United States.

See also
 List of eurypterids

References

Eurypteroidea
Silurian arthropods of North America
Silurian eurypterids
Eurypterids of North America
Bertie Formation
Fossil taxa described in 1966